The LRSVM M-18 Oganj is a modular self-propelled multiple rocket launcher developed in Serbia on 6x6 chassis. It can have 2 to 8 containers with different guided and unguided missiles.

Development
Development of  LRSVM M-18 Oganj is partially based on existing LRSVM Morava but on 6x6 chassis with armored cab and new set of electronics and possible missiles that can be launched from containers. Added new possibilities enable launcher to easy orient itself with GPS/GLONASS assistance and inertial navigation and launch different types of guided and unguided missiles with some of them still in development. It can use RALAS(previously known as LORANA), ALAS and Košava 1 guided missiles. Vehicle possess antenna and other relevant parts of computerized guidance system needed to launch guided missiles, has new digital radio and Inertial navigation system. It can also use variety of unguided missiles in 107, 122 and 128mm caliber. During live firing it has achieved 40km range with G-2000 122mm unguided missile. It is based on FAP 2228 6x6 chassis.

Rockets
There are many domestic models of rockets that LRSVM M-18 Oganj can use.

Beside domestically developed rocket it can also use all known Grad missiles.

See also

Related development
 LRSVM Morava

Comparable systems
LYNX (MRL)
Astros 2020 (Mk6)

References

Military Technical Institute Belgrade
Modular rocket launchers
Multiple rocket launchers
Self-propelled artillery of Serbia
Rocket artillery